João Pedro Azevedo Silva (born 29 December 1987), known as João Pedro, is a Portuguese professional footballer who plays as a central defender.

Club career
Born in Trofa, Porto District, João Pedro began his youth career at hometown club C.D. Trofense and finished it at FC Porto, where he made his senior debut with the reserves in the third division. He was also called up twice to the first team for Primeira Liga matches in which he was an unused substitute, including the 1–1 draw at city rivals Boavista F.C. on the final day of the season. He was subsequently sent out on a string of loans, including spending the 2008–09 campaign at AF Gloria Bistrița in Romania's Liga I.

In 2010, João Pedro left the Estádio do Dragão to sign for C.D. Aves of the Segunda Liga, and on 29 June 2012 he joined top-flight G.D. Estoril Praia. He made his debut in the latter competition on 17 August in the opening game of the season, but added only four more appearances over the campaign and just one substitute cameo in the next.

João Pedro's 2014–15 was spent between F.C. Penafiel and Moreirense F.C. in the top tier, totalling just 14 games in all. On 31 August 2014, in just his second appearance for the former side, he was sent off in a 0–1 home loss to F.C. Paços de Ferreira.

Subsequently, João Pedro returned to division two with F.C. Famalicão. He continued to play there in the following seasons, with Aves, C.D. Santa Clara, Estoril and Leixões SC.

International career
All youth levels comprised, João Pedro won 62 caps for Portugal and scored nine goals. His first and only appearance with the under-21 side occurred on 12 October 2007, in a 1–0 defeat in Bulgaria for the 2009 UEFA European Championship qualifiers.

References

External links

1987 births
Living people
Sportspeople from Trofa
Portuguese footballers
Association football defenders
Primeira Liga players
Liga Portugal 2 players
Segunda Divisão players
C.D. Trofense players
FC Porto B players
FC Porto players
G.D. Tourizense players
Portimonense S.C. players
F.C. Penafiel players
C.D. Aves players
G.D. Estoril Praia players
Moreirense F.C. players
F.C. Famalicão players
C.D. Santa Clara players
Leixões S.C. players
Liga I players
ACF Gloria Bistrița players
Portugal youth international footballers
Portugal under-21 international footballers
Portuguese expatriate footballers
Expatriate footballers in Romania
Portuguese expatriate sportspeople in Romania